Stange Sportsklubb is a Norwegian multi-sports club from Stange, Hedmark, Norway. It has sections for association football, floor hockey, ice hockey, speed skating and Nordic skiing.

The club was founded as Stange TF on 20 September 1904. The name was changed when shifting away from being a pure gymnastics club, to Stange TIF and in 1928 Stange IL. Stange also had a Worker's Confederation of Sport club named Stange AIL from 1935, which merged with Stange IL in 1945, rendering the new name Stange SK.

The club does currently not field a men's football team. Its last stint in the 3. divisjon, the fourth tier of Norwegian football, was from 2010 to 2011.

The club is also known for its speed skaters, including Inger Karset and Martine Ripsrud.

References

Official site

Football clubs in Norway
Sport in Hedmark
Stange
1904 establishments in Norway
Association football clubs established in 1904
Speed skating clubs in Norway